The Gauliga Baden was the highest football league in the German state of Baden from 1933 to 1945. Shortly after the formation of the league, the Nazis reorganised the administrative regions in Germany, and the Gau Baden replaced the state Baden.

Overview
The league was introduced in 1933 by the Nazi Sports Office, after the Nazi take over of power in Germany and Baden. It replaced the Bezirksliga as the highest level of play in German football competitions.

The Gauliga Baden was established with ten clubs, all from the state of Baden.

The Gauliga replaced as such the Bezirksliga Württemberg-Baden and Bezirksliga Rhein-Saar, the highest leagues in the region until then.

In its first season, the league had ten clubs, playing each other once at home and once away. The league winner qualified for the German championship while the bottom two teams were relegated. The league remained unchanged until the outbreak of World War II.

In this era, the only success to come for a club from Baden was, when the SV Waldhof Mannheim reached the German cup final in 1939, losing to the 1. FC Nürnberg.

In 1939–40, the league played in four different groups with a finals round at the end to determine the Baden champion. The year after, it returned to its old system.

For the 1941–42 season, the Gauliga Baden split into a northern and a southern group with six teams each and a four-team finals round. In 1942–43 it returned to a single, ten-team format. Another change of system for the season after meant 19 clubs in three groups with a three team-finals round.

The imminent collapse of Nazi Germany in 1945 gravely affected all Gauligas and football in Baden ceased in January 1945 with none of the groups having absolved their full program.

With the end of the Nazi era, the Gauligas ceased to exist and the state of Baden found itself sub divided between two allied occupation zones, the French zone in the south and the US zone in the north.

The northern half soon saw the formation of the Oberliga Süd as the highest football league for the US occupation zone, while the south became part of the Oberliga Südwest.

Founding members of the league
The ten founding members and their positions in the 1932–33 Bezirksliga Württemberg/Baden and Bezirksliga Rhein/Saar season were:
 SV Waldhof Mannheim, winner Rhein division
 VfR Mannheim, 5th Rhein division
 Freiburger FC, 4th Baden division
 Phönix Karlsruhe, winner Baden division
 1. FC Pforzheim, 4th Württemberg division
 Karlsruher FV, 2nd Baden division
 VfL Neckarau, 3rd Rhein division
 VfB Mühlburg, merger club of VfB Karlsruhe (3rd) and FC Mühlburg (5th)
 Germania Brötzingen, 6th Württemberg division
 SC Freiburg, 6th Baden division

Winners and runners-up of the Gauliga Baden
The winners and runners-up of the league:

Placings in the Gauliga Baden 1933–44
The complete list of all clubs participating in the league:

 1 In 1943, the Phönix Karlsruhe and Germania Durlach formed the KSG Karlsruhe.

References

Sources
 Die deutschen Gauligen 1933–45 – Heft 1–3  Tables of the Gauligas 1933–45, publisher: DSFS
 Kicker Almanach,  The yearbook on German football from Bundesliga to Oberliga, since 1937, published by the Kicker Sports Magazine
 Süddeutschlands Fussballgeschichte in Tabellenform 1897–1988  History of Southern German football in tables, publisher & author: Ludolf Hyll

External links
 The Gauligas  Das Deutsche Fussball Archiv
 Germany – Championships 1902–1945 at RSSSF.com

Gauliga
Football competitions in Baden-Württemberg
Sports leagues established in 1933
1933 establishments in Germany
1945 disestablishments in Germany
History of Baden
Sports leagues disestablished in 1945